Opened in 1949, Sportpark De Luiten was a multi-use stadium in Roosendaal, Netherlands.  It was used mostly for football matches and hosted the home matches of RBC Roosendaal. The stadium was able to hold 6,800 people. It was closed and demolished in 2000 when Rosada Stadion opened.

Sources
 Reurink, Ferry (2007): Het Stadioncomplex. Alle terreinen in Nederland waar betaald voetbal is gespeeld. Amsterdam: De Arbeiderspers

External links
 EU-Football.info: Sportpark De Luiten 

RBC Roosendaal
Defunct football venues in the Netherlands
Sports venues in North Brabant
Sports venues completed in 1949
Sports venues demolished in 2000